Rita Borók (born 28 July 1973 in Debrecen) is a former Hungarian handballer who played many years for Debrecen in right back position.

Achievements 

 Nemzeti Bajnokság I:
 Winner: 2003
 Silver Medallist: 1994, 1995, 1996
 EHF Cup:
 Winner: 1996
 EHF Champions League:
 Finalist: 2001

References 

Living people
Hungarian female handball players
Expatriate handball players

Hungarian expatriate sportspeople in Denmark
People from Debrecen
1973 births